Seven United States presidents have made presidential visits to Northern Europe. Richard Nixon became the first incumbent president to visit a Northern European country when he went to Iceland in 1973. The first trips were an offshoot of the general easing of the geo-political tensions between the U.S. and the Soviet Union during the Cold War. To date, every nation in the region has been visited at least once: Finland (6), Denmark (4), Latvia (3), Estonia (2), Iceland (2), Norway (2), Sweden (2), and Lithuania (1).

Table of visits

See also
 Foreign policy of the United States

References

Denmark–United States relations
Finland–United States relations
Iceland–United States relations
Norway–United States relations
Sweden–United States relations
Lists of United States presidential visits
Estonia–United States relations
Latvia–United States relations
Lithuania–United States relations